Arthur Mathews (born 30 April 1959) is an Irish comedy writer and actor who, often with writing partners such as Graham Linehan, Paul Woodfull and Matt Berry, has either written or contributed to television comedies, such as Father Ted, Big Train, and Toast of London and Harry Enfield and Chums.

Early life

Mathews attended Castleknock College, a private school run by Vincentian priests. He then graduated from the Dublin Institute of Technology with a degree in graphic design. He played drums in spoof U2 tribute act "The Joshua Trio" with Paul Woodfull, with whom he would later work on I, Keano. He worked as art editor for Hot Press, leaving in 1991 to move to London.

Writing career

Television
Mathews has contributed to many sketch shows, including Harry Enfield and Chums, The All New Alexei Sayle Show and the Ted & Ralph segments of The Fast Show.

However, it was with Father Ted (three series, 1995–1998) that he and Graham Linehan made their biggest impression. It debuted on Channel 4. The writing partnership had previously co-written the comedy Paris (one series, 1994), also for Channel 4.

Both Linehan and Mathews worked on the first series of sketch show Big Train, but Linehan dropped out for the second series. Mathews has also contributed to other British comedies such as Brass Eye, Jam, Black Books and later Toast of London. He later contributed sketches for Kevin Eldon, including the Amish Sex Pistols.

In 1999, Linehan and Mathews created the sixties-set sitcom Hippies, but the six-part series (which starred Simon Pegg and Sally Phillips) was written by Mathews alone.

In late 2003, the two men were named one of the 50 funniest acts to work in television by The Observer.

Theatre
In 2005, Mathews, with Michael Nugent and Paul Woodfull, co-wrote I, Keano, a comedy musical play about footballer Roy Keane leaving the Republic of Ireland national football team before the 2002 FIFA World Cup.

It is presented as a mock-epic melodrama about an ancient Roman legion preparing for war. In its first two years, over half a million people watched it, generating €10m ($13m) in ticket sales. In January 2008, it began its fourth year of performances. He confirmed in 2018 that he and Linehan were working together on a Father Ted musical.

Television appearances
Linehan and Mathews appeared in the sitcom I'm Alan Partridge as two Irish television producers considering hiring Alan Partridge as a presenter. Mathews later starred in I Am Not An Animal, an animated comedy series about talking animals written by Peter Baynham.

References

Credits

Books
 Father Ted: The Craggy Island Parish Magazines (with Graham Linehan (Hardback – Boxtree – 18 September 1998) 
 Father Ted: The Complete Scripts (with Graham Linehan (Paperback – Boxtree – 20 October 2000) 
 Well Remembered Days: Eoin O'Ceallaigh's Memoirs of a Twentieth-century Irish Catholic (Paperback – Macmillan – 9 March 2001) .
 Toast on Toast: Cautionary tales and candid advice, a spoof autobiography of Steven Toast. 2015 (with Matt Berry).
 The Cummings Files

Cartoons
 "Doctor Crawshaft's World of Pop", in NME (1992–93)
 "The chairman", in the Observer Sports Monthly (2003–04)

External links

1959 births
Living people
Alumni of Dublin Institute of Technology
Father Ted
Hot Press people
Irish comedy writers
Irish dramatists and playwrights
Irish male dramatists and playwrights
Irish humorists
Irish satirists
Irish television writers
People from County Meath
People educated at Castleknock College
Male television writers